Surp Khach Church (Holy Cross Church) is an 18th-century Armenian church in Nor Nakhichevan. It is the oldest surviving monument in the borders of Rostov-on-Don.

History 
The church was built in 1786–1792. In 1972, it was turned into a museum of Russian-Armenian friendship, but was reopened as an Armenian Apostolic Church in 2000.

The church is situated in the modern-day Voroshilovsky (North) rayon, on a high hill near the river. Several famous Armenian people like Harutyun Alamdaryan, Raphael Patkanian and Mikael Nalbandian are buried near the church.

See also 

 Nakhichevan-on-Don

References 

Armenian Apostolic churches in Russia
Churches in Rostov-on-Don
1786 establishments in the Russian Empire
Churches completed in 1792
18th-century churches in Russia
Cultural heritage monuments in Rostov-on-Don
Cultural heritage monuments of federal significance in Rostov Oblast